Greece competed at the 2019 European Athletics Indoor Championships in Glasgow, Scotland, between 1 and 3 March 2019 with 17 athletes.

Medals

Results

Men
Track & road events

Field Events

Women
Track & road events

Field Events

Key
Q = Qualified for the next round
q = Qualified for the next round as a fastest loser or, in field events, by position without achieving the qualifying target
NR = National record
PB = Personal best
SB = Season's best
N/A = Round not applicable for the event
Bye = Athlete not required to compete in round

References

European Athletics Championships
2019